Liiküla  is a village in Saaremaa Parish, Saare County in western Estonia. As per 2011 census the village had nine people.

Before the administrative reform in 2017, the village was in Mustjala Parish.

References

Villages in Saare County